Langonnet is a commune in the Morbihan department of Brittany in north-western France.

Geography

Langonnet is in north-west part of Cornouaille, in Lower Brittany. It's one of the few Cornouaille parishes that are now in the Morbihan department. Thus the main language was the Breton language until the advent of intensive farming after the second world war at which point the people, who were bilingual, switched to the French language.

The parish holds two main human settlements:
 the actual town of Langonnet in the south
 the town of La Trinité-Langonnet in north-east

In the south-east there's the Notre-Dame de Langonnet abbey.

Topography

The highest point of the parish the calotte Saint Joseph, a round hill whose top is at 292 meters. It offers a nice view over the surrounding area (most of the parish is at 190 meter level).

Neighboring communes

Langonnet is border by Plouray and Priziac to the east, by  Le Faouët to the south, by Le Saint and Gourin to the west and by Tréogan, Plévin, Paule and Glomel to the north.

Map

Toponymy 
Its Breton name is written Langoned in modern breton but it has been written differently along the years (because of different tentatives to transcribe the Breton phonetic system with the Latin alphabet):

 XIe siècle : (Lan)Chunuett
 1152 : Langenoit
 1161 : Langonio
 1168 : Lanngonio
 1301 : Lenguenet
 1368 : Langonec
 1368 : Langonio
 1373 : Languenec
 1516 : Langonet
 1516 : Langonio
 1536 : Langonnet
 1574 : Langonec
 1630 : Langouet
 Today: Langoned

The Langoned name is said to come from Lann-Conet, the monastery (See lan in Breton, llan in welsh language) of Conet (or Conoit, Konoed, Kon(n)ed, Konoid = Cynwyd, Kynwyd or Kynyd in welsh), a Welsh saint that came in Brittany.

Demographics
Inhabitants of Langonnet are called in French Langonnetais, in Breton Langonediz. Langonnet's population peaked at 4,848 in 1931 and declined to 1,724 in 2019. This represents a 64.4 % decrease in total population since the peak census figure.

Breton language
The municipality launched a linguistic plan through Ya d'ar brezhoneg on 27 January 2005.

Gallery

Landscapes

See also
Communes of the Morbihan department

References

External links

Official site 

 Mayors of Morbihan Association 

Communes of Morbihan